Heart Without Mercy is a 1958 West German crime film directed by Viktor Tourjansky and starring Barbara Rütting, Hansjörg Felmy and Werner Hinz.

It was made at the Wandsbek Studios in Hamburg. The film's sets were designed by the art director Albrecht Becker and Herbert Kirchhoff.

Cast
 Barbara Rütting as Anja Wegener
 Hansjörg Felmy as Ulrich Rombach
 Werner Hinz as Friedrich Rombach
 Hans Nielsen as Dr. Waagemann
 Margarete Haagen as Mimi Busse
 Corny Collins as Hilde Wegener
 Günter Pfitzmann as Dr. Knoll
 Josef Dahmen as Kriminalrat Dorn
 Lotte Brackebusch as Frau Wegener
 Elly Burgmer
 Wilhelm Walter
 Manfred Kunst
 Kai Fischer as Christa
 Henry Vahl as Gärtner Volmer

References

Bibliography 
 Hake, Sabine. German National Cinema. Routledge, 2002.

External links 
 

1958 films
West German films
German crime films
1958 crime films
1950s German-language films
Films directed by Victor Tourjansky
Films based on German novels
Real Film films
Films shot at Wandsbek Studios
1950s German films